West Coast Railway can refer to:

 Avanti West Coast, franchised railway operator in the United Kingdom
 West Coast Railways, railway spot-hire company in the United Kingdom
 West Coast Railway (Victoria), defunct passenger train operator in Australia
 West Coast Railway Association, a heritage railway in British Columbia, Canada
 Railways on the West Coast of Tasmania
 West Coast Wilderness Railway, a heritage railway in Tasmania, Australia
 West Coast Main Line, a railway line in the United Kingdom.